"Fire" is a song recorded by South Korean boy group BTS for their first compilation album, The Most Beautiful Moment in Life: Young Forever (2016). The original Korean version was released by Big Hit on May 2, 2016, in South Korea with the Japanese version being released September 7, 2016, on their full album Youth, under Universal Music Japan and Virgin Music-Def Jam Recordings.

Music video 
The music video for "Fire" was released on May 2. The video was produced and directed by Lumpens and GDW. Fuse stated the cut "[felt] like an upgraded version of "Dope" and showcased "the guys whipping out their most intense choreography to date". On May 9, BTS released the dance version of the "Fire" video ahead of their promotion on music programs. The dance was choreographed by Keone Madrid and Vinh Nguyen. Two copies of the music video were uploaded on YouTube: one by 1theK and the other by Hybe Labels. As of November 2021, the music video uploaded by 1theK has over 710 million views.

Commercial performance 
BTS topped the Billboard World Digital Songs chart with the single. The videos for "Save Me" ranked first on the Most Viewed K-Pop Videos in America, Around the World: May 2016 list revealed by Billboard.

Promotion 
BTS decided to promote on music shows only for a week, performing on Mnet, KBS, MBC and SBS as planned to allow for individual activities, performances and overseas schedules, starting with M! Countdown on May 12. The song was promoted at SBS Gayo Daejeon in December 2018.

Credits and personnel 
The Korean credits are adapted from the CD liner notes of The Most Beautiful Moment in Life: Young Forever.

Pdogg- producer, keyboard, synthesizer, chorus, vocal and rap arrangement, recording engineer @ Dogg Bounce
"hitman" bang- producer
RM- producer
SUGA- producer
Devine Channel- producer
Jungkook- chorus
Jimin- chorus
James F. Reynolds- mix engineer

Accolades

Charts

Weekly charts

Year-end charts

Sales

Release history

External links
 "Fire" Music Video on Youtube
 "Fire (Choreography Version)" Music Video on Youtube

References 

2016 singles
Korean-language songs
Japanese-language songs
BTS songs
Songs written by Bang Si-hyuk
Music videos directed by Lumpens
2016 songs
Songs written by RM (rapper)
Songs written by Suga (rapper)
Songs written by Pdogg
Hybe Corporation singles